Pieve d'Olmi is a comune (municipality) in the Province of Cremona in the Italian region Lombardy, located about  southeast of Milan and about  southeast of Cremona.

Pieve d'Olmi borders the following municipalities: Bonemerse, Malagnino, San Daniele Po, Sospiro, Stagno Lombardo, Polesine Zibello.

References

Cities and towns in Lombardy